Crocanthes eurypyra is a moth in the family Lecithoceridae. It was described by Edward Meyrick in 1918. It is found on New Guinea.

The forewings are orange with dark purple-fuscous markings. There is a basal patch, the outer edge rather convex, running from one-third of the costa to before one-fourth of the dorsum, connected by a slender costal streak with the terminal band. A somewhat pentagonal spot is found in the middle of the disc and a terminal band, with the edge slightly concave, runs from three-fourths of the costa to just before the tornus. The hindwings are orange with dark fuscous markings. There is a small basal patch, hardly extending to one-fifth of the wing and a trapezoidal spot in the disc at two-fifths, broadest above. There is also an apical fascia, broad on the costa, attenuated to below the middle of the termen.

References

Moths described in 1918
Crocanthes